The 1920 Missouri lieutenant gubernatorial election was held on November 2, 1920. Republican nominee Hiram Lloyd defeated Democratic nominee Carter M. Buford with 54.49% of the vote.

Primary elections
Primary elections were held on August 3, 1920.

Democratic primary

Candidates
Carter M. Buford, State Senator
Robert S. McClintic

Results

Republican primary

Candidates
Hiram Lloyd, former State Representative
Politte Elvins, former U.S. Representative

Results

General election

Candidates
Major party candidates
Hiram Lloyd, Republican
Carter M. Buford, Democratic

Other candidates
Louis Schneider, Socialist
E. H. Wessler, Farmer–Labor
Theodore Baeff, Socialist Labor

Results

References

1920
Gubernatorial
Missouri